Rachid Farssi (born 15 January 1985) is a Belgian football player currently playing for FAR Rabat.

References
Guardian Football

Belgian footballers
1985 births
Living people
Challenger Pro League players
Belgian Pro League players
C.S. Visé players
K.A.S. Eupen players
K.V.C. Westerlo players
S.K. Beveren players
Lierse S.K. players
AS FAR (football) players
Footballers from Liège
Association football midfielders